The Watercat M14 landing craft is a type of military transport in use by the Royal Malaysia Police. The manufacturer is Marine Alutech Oy Ab, Finland

History
The Jurmo was the result of modernisation in the Finnish Navy in the late 1990s. It was designed to replace the existing Uisko class landing craft. Its main purpose is landing and transportation operations for the Finnish Coastal Jaegers in all weather conditions. It has good maneuverability and can come to a full stop in only one ship length from top speed. Low draft makes it suitable for amphibious assault even in shallow waters.

The Watercat M14 can transport 5 tons of cargo or 16 men.

Operators 
Royal Malaysia Police: 10 vessels of the Watercat M14 version.

Related development
G class landing craft
Uisko class landing craft
Jurmo class landing craft

References

External links
Finnish Defence Forces Website of The Finnish Defence Forces
Marine Alutech Website of Marine Alutech
 Video in Youtube

Ships built in Finland
Landing craft
Military boats